Jackson Township is an inactive township in Ozark County, in the U.S. state of Missouri.

Jackson Township was established in 1860, taking its name from Andrew Jackson, 7th President of the United States.

References

Townships in Missouri
Townships in Ozark County, Missouri